Karl Preining is an Austrian para-alpine skier. He represented Austria at the 1984 Winter Paralympics and at the 1988 Winter Paralympics.

In 1984, he won three gold medals in alpine skiing: in the Men's Alpine Combination B1 event, in the Men's Downhill B1 event and in the Men's Giant Slalom B1 event.

See also 
 List of Paralympic medalists in alpine skiing

References 

Living people
Year of birth missing (living people)
Place of birth missing (living people)
Paralympic alpine skiers of Austria
Alpine skiers at the 1984 Winter Paralympics
Cross-country skiers at the 1984 Winter Paralympics
Cross-country skiers at the 1988 Winter Paralympics
Medalists at the 1984 Winter Paralympics
Paralympic gold medalists for Austria
Paralympic medalists in alpine skiing
20th-century Austrian people